The Landmarks of the Ancient Kingdom of Saba, Marib is a serial property consisted of seven archeological sites in Marib Governorate, eastern Yemen. On 25 January 2023, the landmarks have been added by the UNESCO to its World Heritage Site List as they bear witness to the ancient Kingdom of Saba in ancient South Arabia. They were also placed on the List of World Heritage in Danger due to the threats posed by the Yemeni Civil War.

Landmarks

See also 

 List of World Heritage Sites in Yemen
 Ancient history of Yemen

References 

Landmarks of the Ancient Kingdom of Saba (Marib)
World Heritage Sites in Yemen
World Heritage Sites in Danger
Archaeological sites in Yemen